Jimmy Rogers is a double compilation album of the blues guitarist Jimmy Rogers. The album was published as part of the Chess Masters series.

Track listing
All tracks written by Jimmy Rogers. Published by Arc Music, BMI.

Side one
 "Left Me with a Broken Heart" (1953) – 2:55
 "Blues All Day Long" (1954) – 3:00
 "Today Today Blues (1950)" – 3:07
 "The World's in a Tangle" (1951) – 2:55
 "She Loves Another Man" (1951) – 2:50
 "Hard Working Man" (1951) – 2:21

Side two
 "Chance to Love" (1951) – 2:20
 "My Little Machine" (1951) – 3:06
 "Mistreated Baby" (1952) – 2:25
 "What's the Matter" (1952) – 3:10
 "You're the One" (1955) – 2:26
 "If It Ain't Me" (1956) – 2:00

Side three
 "One Kiss" (1957) – 2:45
 "I Can't Believe" (1957)- 3:00
 "What Have I Done" (1957) – 2:42
 "My Baby Don't Love Me No More" (1957) – 2:20
 "Trace of You" (1957) – 2:32
 "Don't You Know My Baby" (1956) – 2:31

Side four
 "Crying Shame" (1952) – 2:47
 "Give Love Another Chance" (1952) – 2:58
 "This Has Never Been" (1956) – 4:29
 "Rock This House" (1959) – 2:53
 "My Last Meal" (1959) – 3:00
 "You Don't know" (1960) – 2:41
 "Can't Keep from Worrying" (1960) – 2:29

Personnel

Jimmy Rogers – vocals, guitar on all tracks except "Give Love Another Chance", on which Rogers only plays guitar.
 A. J. Gladys – drums
 Big-Crawford – bass
 Bob Woodfork – guitar
 Eddie Ware – piano, vocal on "Give love Another Chance"
 Elgin Evans – drums
 Ernest Cotton – tenor sax
 Francis Clay – drums
 Fred Below – drums
 'Fred Robertson' – guitar (actually Freddy Robinson)
 George Hunter – drums
 Henry Gray – piano
 Joe Young – guitar
 Johnny Jones – piano
 J. T. Brown – tenor sax
 Little Walter – harp, guitar on "Hard Working Man"
 Luther Tucker – guitar
 Muddy Waters – guitar
 Odie Payne – drums
 Otis Spann – piano
 S. P. Leary – drums
 Walter Horton – harp
 Wayne Bennett – guitar
 Willie Dixon – bass

Notes and sources
 Track Listings and Credits as they appear on Chess CH-2-9211

1984 compilation albums
Jimmy Rogers albums
Chess Records compilation albums